Jandía is a peninsula in the southwestern part of the island of Fuerteventura in the Canary Islands. The peninsula is entirely in the municipality of Pájara. Within the peninsula is Fuerteventura's tallest mountain, Pico de Jandía or Pico de la Zarza, that rises to an elevation of 807 m. Jandía is connected with the rest of Fuerteventura through the isthmus Istmo de la Pared. Most of the peninsula has been a nature reserve (Parque Natural de Jandía) since 1987.

On the south and east coasts of Jandía there are the beach resorts Jandía Playa and Morro Jable. The western coast has some of the most beautiful and sandiest beaches in Fuerteventura and these are also used by surfers. The small fishing village of Cofete and the Villa Winter are situated on the north side of the peninsula.

Panorama

References

External links

 Morro Jable information, map and photos 
 http://www.fuerteventura-infos.de/fuerteventura-report/jandia_report.htm
 Jandia Jandia information and photographs
 Panoramic photo of Jandia and Fuerteventura

Fuerteventura
Peninsulas of Spain
Landforms of the Canary Islands